Helianthus ambiguus is a North American species of sunflower known by the common name ambiguous sunflower. It is found only in the Great Lakes region of the United States, the states of New York, Michigan, Ohio, and Wisconsin.

References

ambiguus
Flora of the Northern United States
Plants described in 1842